The manga  was written and illustrated by Go Nagai and originally published by Kodansha from  to  in Shonen Magazine. The series has been published in tankōbon format several times, most of them by Kodansha (with the exception of the ebook format and some special editions). Starting the 1987 publishing, most Kodansha editions include, as part of the volumes, the manga Shin Devilman (which originally was not meant to be included in the canon of the original series).

Outside Japan, Devilman has been published in France, Hong Kong, Italy, South Korea and Taiwan. In France, it was published in 1999-2000 by Dynamic Visions, translated by Federico Colpi; in Hong Kong it has been published twice, one in 1993 and the other in 1999 and the Taiwanese edition is also available there; in Italy it has been published four times, the first time from 1991 to 1993 by Granata Press, the second time in 1996 by Dynamic Italia, the third time by d/visual from 2004 to 2005, and the last time by Jpop in 2013; and in Taiwan, it was published by d/visual taipei in 2005.

There is also a publication called Go Nagai's Devilman: The Devil's Incarnation published in 1986 by Dynamic Production for the United States. It contains chapters from the first tankōbon and it was translated by Willard Carroll with David Lewis. It is the only official version of the original manga published for the US.

The Shin Devilman manga was partially released in a digitally colored version with slightly revised art in the US in 1995 by Glenn Danzig under his label Verotik under the title Devilman. The manga has also been published in Italy by d/visual where it is known as Devilman: Time Travellers.

Volume list
Kodansha (Kodansha Comics, 1972)

Kodansha (Kodansha Bunko, 1978)

Kodansha (Kodansha Comics, 1983)

Kodansha (1987)

Kodansha (KC Magazine, 1993)

Kodansha (Kodansha Bunko, 1997)

Kodansha (Super Best KC, 2000)

Kodansha (Bilingual Comics, 2002)

*This is the only edition that has been officially translated into English completely, although it was not released outside Japan. The translation was done by Jeffrey Playford.

Kodansha (KPC, 2004)

Kodansha (KCDX, 2008)

References

Devilman chapters
Chapters